Curitibanos is a Brazilian municipality in the state of Santa Catarina. It is located at 27º16'58" south latitude and 50º35'04" west longitude, at an elevation of 987 metres. It has an area of 953.67 km² and its population, according to 2018 IBGE estimates, was 39,595 inhabitants.

References

External links

Municipalities in Santa Catarina (state)